A folk singer or folksinger or is a person who sings traditional or contemporary folk music. 

Folksinger may also refer to:

 Folk Singer (album), a 1964 album by Muddy Waters
 Folksinger (album), a 1985 album by Phranc
 "Folksinger" (Phranc song), 1989
 "The Folk Singer" (Tommy Roe song), 1963
 "The Folk Singer" or "Folk Singer", a 1968 song by Johnny Cash
 The Belafonte Folk Singers
 Dave Van Ronk, Folksinger, a 1962 album by Dave Van Ronk
 Folksingers 'Round Harvard Square, a 1959 album by Joan Baez
 My Son, the Folk Singer, a 1962 album by Allan Sherman